The first season of The Hills, an American reality television series, consists of 10 episodes and was broadcast on MTV. It aired from May 31, 2006, until August 2, 2006. The season was filmed from August 2005 to May 2006 in Los Angeles, California, with additional footage in New York City. The executive producer was Liz Gateley.

The Hills focuses on the lives of Lauren Conrad, Audrina Patridge, Whitney Port, and Heidi Montag. During the season, Conrad moves from Laguna Beach to Los Angeles. Accompanied by her best friend and housemate Montag, the pair attend the Fashion Institute of Design & Merchandising, though the latter left the college after receiving employment from Bolthouse Productions. Conrad befriends Port through an internship with Teen Vogue, while Montag develops a companionship with Patridge after learning that she lives in their apartment building.

Synopsis
Lauren's road to independence was documented shortly after leaving Laguna Beach and moving to Los Angeles with her then best friend, Heidi Montag. The friends discovers that the LA lifestyle is not all it's cracked up to be, after learning the harsh reality of balancing social life, love, and careers, as old flames resurface, new friendships are formed, and secrets are exposed. All while, they are working toward the goals and ambitions they set for themselves in high school.

Cast

Episodes

References

External links
Season 1 on MTV

1
2006 American television seasons